Barbara Bakulin (born 23 September 1950) is a Polish sprinter. She competed in the women's 4 × 100 metres relay at the 1972 Summer Olympics.

References

1950 births
Living people
Athletes (track and field) at the 1972 Summer Olympics
Polish female sprinters
Olympic athletes of Poland
Place of birth missing (living people)
Universiade silver medalists for Poland
Universiade medalists in athletics (track and field)
Medalists at the 1973 Summer Universiade
Medalists at the 1975 Summer Universiade
Olympic female sprinters
20th-century Polish women